This is a list of reptiles occurring in Tasmania:

Order: Squamata (lizards and snakes)

Lizards

Snakes

Order: Testudines (turtles and tortoises)

References

 

 List
Reptiles
Tasmania